The Statute Law Revision (Northern Ireland) Act 1973 (c 55) is an Act of the Parliament of the United Kingdom.

Section 1 of, and the Schedule to, this Act were repealed by Group 1 of Part IX of Schedule 1 to the Statute Law (Repeals) Act 1998.

See also
Statute Law Revision Act

References
Bibliography
The Public General Acts 1973. HMSO. London. 1974. Volume II. Page 1623.
HL Deb vol 342, cols 187 to 189, HC Deb vol 860, cols 1542 to 1543.
Citations

United Kingdom Acts of Parliament 1973